Niall Griffin (born 12 August 1977) is an Irish equestrian.

He participated at the 2004 Summer Olympics in Athens. He competed at the 2008 Summer Olympics in Beijing, where he placed 8th in team eventing with the Irish team. He also competed in individual eventing.

References

External links
 

1977 births
Living people
Sportspeople from Dublin (city)
Irish male equestrians
Olympic equestrians of Ireland
Equestrians at the 2004 Summer Olympics
Equestrians at the 2008 Summer Olympics
20th-century Irish people
21st-century Irish people